Zenon Jaskuła (born 4 June 1962) is a Polish former professional racing cyclist from Śrem, who was active in the 1990s. He won stage 16 and finished third overall in the 1993 Tour de France. He competed in the team time trial at the 1988 Summer Olympics winning a silver medal.

Major results

1981
 1st Stage 9 Tour de Pologne
1983
 1st Stage 3 Circuit des Ardennes
1985
 1st  Duo time trial, National Road Championships (with Lech Piasecki)
 1st Prologue & Stages 3 & 9 Tour de Pologne
 1st Stage 1 Dookoła Mazowsza
 1st Stage 1 Circuit de la Sarthe
1986
 1st  Time trial, National Road Championships
 1st Overall Settimana Ciclistica Bergamasca
1987
 1st  Time trial, National Road Championships
1988
 1st  Time trial, National Road Championships
 2nd  Team time trial, Olympic Games
 2nd Overall Niedersachsen Rundfahrt
1st Stages 1 & 9
1989
 2nd  Team time trial, UCI Road World Championships
 2nd Overall Niedersachsen Rundfahrt
 3rd Overall Peace Race
 6th Overall Tour of Sweden
1990
 1st  Road race, National Road Championships
 1st Overall Cronostaffetta
1st Stage 2
 2nd Overall Tirreno–Adriatico
 2nd Trofeo Baracchi (with Joachim Halupczok)
 5th Overall Tour de Suisse
1991
 7th Overall Tour de Romandie
 9th Overall Giro d'Italia
 9th Firenze–Pistoia
 9th Giro dell'Emilia
1992
 1st Stages 8 & 9 Herald Sun Tour
 3rd Overall Giro del Trentino
 3rd GP Industria & Commercio di Prato
 3rd Melbourne–Mount Buller
 3rd Mazda Alpine Tour
 9th Overall Tour de Romandie
 10th Giro di Toscana
1993
 3rd Overall Tour de France
1st Stages 4 (TTT) & 16
 1st Stage 6 (ITT) Tour de Suisse
 7th Overall Giro del Trentino
 8th Telekom Grand Prix
 10th Overall Giro d'Italia
1994
 1st Trofeo dello Scalatore
 3rd Milano–Torino
 9th Time trial, UCI Road World Championships
 9th Giro del Veneto
1995
 2nd Memorial Trochanowski em Varsóvia
 3rd Overall Tour de Suisse
 4th Overall Ronde van Nederland
 5th Subida a Urkiola
 7th Time trial, UCI Road World Championships
 9th Overall Tour DuPont
1997
 1st  Overall Volta a Portugal
1st Stages 6 & 12
 2nd Overall Tour de Pologne
 9th Time trial, UCI Road World Championships

Grand Tour general classification results timeline

References

External links

1962 births
Living people
Polish male cyclists
Polish Tour de France stage winners
Olympic cyclists of Poland
Olympic silver medalists for Poland
Cyclists at the 1988 Summer Olympics
People from Śrem
Olympic medalists in cycling
Tour de Suisse stage winners
Sportspeople from Greater Poland Voivodeship
Medalists at the 1988 Summer Olympics
Volta a Portugal winners
20th-century Polish people